During the 2007–08 season, Newcastle United participated in the Premier League. Newcastle started the season reasonably well under the management of Sam Allardyce and looked to be in the hunt for European places by the end of October, but a poor November saw the team slide down the table as fans began doubting Allardyce's ability. Despite a reasonable upturn in early December, the team fell further form wise and in the end Mike Ashley chose to terminate Allardyce's contract by mutual consent.

To the surprise of many football fans, the club re-appointed Kevin Keegan as manager, but he was unable to stop the team sliding down the league and fans begun to doubt the appointment. However, Keegan was able to save Newcastle from relegation and the club finished the season in 12th. The team kit for the 2007–08 season was produced by Adidas. The main shirt sponsor was Northern Rock.

Season summary

Manager Sam Allardyce signed several players, including David Rozehnal, Caçapa, Habib Beye, Alan Smith, Joey Barton and Mark Viduka. The season started brightly for Newcastle, with two wins and two draws from their first five games, but they then became the first (and only) side to lose to Derby County that season. Newcastle won only five out of their next 25 Premier League games and could only draw with Derby in the reverse fixture. They also made a third round exit to Arsenal in the League Cup, but made a FA Cup third round draw with Championship club Stoke City. The game against Stoke, however, proved to be Allardyce's last in charge of Newcastle; three days later he was sacked by owner Mike Ashley after pressure from the fans, who were unimpressed with his exclusion of fan favourites from the starting line-up and poor results, despite Allardyce only having been there eight months.

Critics consistently questioned Allardyce's exit from the club, claiming he may not have been given the time needed to impact upon the club in the build-up to the next appointment. There were a number of candidates lined up for the job, including Harry Redknapp, Didier Deschamps, Gérard Houllier and even former England and Middlesbrough manager Steve McClaren. Redknapp turned down the opportunity to manage the club, claiming he felt his job at Portsmouth was yet to be completed.

On 16 January, it was sensationally announced that Kevin Keegan would be returning to the club for a third time, after previous spells both as a player and manager.

The announcement had an immediate impact. On that day the club had a scheduled FA Cup third round replay against Stoke City at home, which was not expected to reach even half capacity; but, upon distribution of the news, 20,000 extra tickets were sold within a couple of hours and the kick-off was delayed to allow the extra fans time to get into the game. The Keegan effect seemed to work on the pitch too as Newcastle convincingly beat Stoke 4–1, even though he was not in the dugout for the match, having arrived during the first half to sit with owner Mike Ashley and the directors.

Shortly after his appointment, Dennis Wise left his position as manager at Leeds United to become director of football at Newcastle. The creation of the new role at the club proved questionable amongst critics and fans, but both Wise and Keegan insisted that the manager would have the final say in all matters regarding the squad. Further appointments saw Tony Jimenez join the club as the vice-president of player recruitment and Jeff Vetere as technical co-ordinator. The idea was to complete a continental-style management structure working in support of Keegan, with Wise and Vetere making the initial assessment before calling in Jimenez to do the deal. David Williamson was also appointed, as director of operations in April.

Keegan's comeback initially did not live up to expectations, with a run of eight games without a win, an FA Cup exit and talk even of a relegation battle. March proved to be a turning point, and, following a change to an attacking line-up with Owen supporting Martins and Viduka up front, the team started to produce results in time for Keegan to maintain his perfect record in the Tyne-Wear derby with a 2–0 home win on 20 April, which put Newcastle's survival beyond all doubt and allowed Keegan to plan for his stated contract length of the next three seasons at the club. With a 2–2 away draw for the following game at West Ham United, the eight-game run of no wins had been turned into a seven-game unbeaten run with two games left to the end of the season. In the final table, Newcastle occupied 12th place on 43 points.

On 22 May, Habib Beye, signed by Allardyce at the start of the season, was named Newcastle's player of the season based on fan votes to a poll organised by the Evening Chronicle.

Final league table

Chronological list of events
7 June 2007: Mark Viduka was signed from Middlesbrough.
14 June 2007: Joey Barton was signed from Manchester City.
29 June 2007: Mike Ashley increased his stake in Newcastle United to 93.2%. David Rozehnal was signed from Paris Saint-Germain.
3 July 2007: Geremi Njitap was signed from Chelsea.
24 July 2007: Newcastle United deputy chairman Chris Mort replaced Freddy Shepherd as chairman of the club.
3 August 2007: Alan Smith was signed from Manchester United.
3 August 2007: Caçapa was signed from Lyon.
6 August 2007: José Enrique was signed from Villarreal.
31 August 2007: Abdoulaye Faye was signed from Bolton Wanderers.
31 August 2007: Habib Beye was signed from Marseille.
4 September 2007: Charles N'Zogbia signed a new five-year contract.
13 November 2007: Adam Sadler was appointed new reserve team manager.

19 November 2007: Paul Barron was appointed new goalkeeping coach.
21 December 2007: Nicky Butt signed a new one-year contract.
7 January 2008: Ben Tozer was signed from Swindon Town.
8 January 2008: Wesley Ngo Baheng was signed from Le Havre.
9 January 2008: Sam Allardyce sacked as manager.
16 January 2008: Kevin Keegan hired as manager.
18 January 2008: Tamás Kádár was signed from Zalaegerszegi TE.
21 January 2008: Arthur Cox joined the coaching staff again as first team coach, reuniting with Keegan and McDermott.
29 January 2008: Dennis Wise was appointed as Executive Director or Football alongside Tony Jimenez as Vice President of Player Recruitment and Jeff Vetere as Technical Co-ordinator.
31 January 2008: Fabio Zamblera was signed from Atalanta B.C.; Ole Söderberg was signed from BK Häcken.
21 February 2008: David Henderson joined the coaching staff as physio from Hearts.
25 February 2008: Chris Hughton joined the coaching staff as first-team coach.
7 March 2008: Lamine Diatta was signed as a free agent.
21 March 2008: Lil Fuccillo was appointed chief scout.
5 April 2008: David Williamson was appointed Executive Director of Operations.

Transfers

In

Out

Players

First-team squad

Left club during season

Reserve squad

Left club during season

Trialists

Match results

Pre-season

Premier League

Last updated: 7 May 2008

FA Cup

League Cup

Player statistics

Appearances and goals

|-
! colspan=14 style=background:#dcdcdc; text-align:center| Goalkeepers

|-
! colspan=14 style=background:#dcdcdc; text-align:center| Defenders

|-
! colspan=14 style=background:#dcdcdc; text-align:center| Midfielders

|-
! colspan=14 style=background:#dcdcdc; text-align:center| Forwards

|-
! colspan=14 style=background:#dcdcdc; text-align:center| Players transferred out during the season

Coaching staff

References

External links
FootballSquads - Newcastle United - 2007/08

Newcastle United F.C. seasons
Newcastle United